Irwin M. Brodo (born 1935) is an emeritus scientist at the Canadian Museum of Nature, in Ottawa, Ontario, Canada. He is an authority on the identification and biology of lichens. Irwin Brodo was honored in 1994 with an Acharius Medal presented to him by the International Association for Lichenology.

Brodo did his undergraduate studies at Columbia University, and received a master's degree from Cornell University. He earned a Ph.D. in lichenology under the supervision of Henry Imshaug at Michigan State University. He later went on to teach at Université Laval and the University of Alaska, and he also supervised master's students at the University of Ottawa and Carleton University.

Brodo's list of publications includes 75 research papers, 8 popular articles, 22 reviews and 6 editorials and obituaries. In 1993, Brodie was awarded the Mary E. Elliot Service Award for his meritorious service to the Canadian Botanical Association — and in 2003, for lifetime achievement, the association's George Lawson Medal. One of Irwin Brodo's great achievements was the publication in 2001 of the 795 page book, "Lichens of North America" with high-quality photographs of lichens taken by Sylvia Sharnoff and Stephen Sharnoff. It won the 2002 National Outdoor Book Award (Nature Guidebook). In 2016, the trio, with additional collaborator Susan Laurie-Bourque, produced Keys to Lichens of North America: Revised and Expanded. In 2013, Brodo was presented with an honorary doctorate from Carleton University, "in recognition of his distinguished career in lichenology and scientific leadership in the international biosystematics community".

Eponyms
Several lichen taxa have been named to honour Brodo. These eponyms include:
Brodoa  (1987)
Bactrospora brodoi  (1993)
Bryoria trichodes subsp. brodoana  (1998)
Lecanora brodoana  (1995)
Lecidea brodoana  (2004)

See also
 :Category:Taxa named by Irwin Brodo

References

Canadian lichenologists
1935 births
20th-century Canadian biologists
20th-century Canadian botanists
Columbia University alumni
Cornell University alumni
Michigan State University alumni
Living people
Acharius Medal recipients
21st-century Canadian biologists
21st-century Canadian botanists